Rúnar Kristinsson (born 5 September 1969) is an Icelandic former professional footballer who played for Lokeren, Lillestrøm SK, Örgryte IS and KR Reykjavík. He is the current manager of KR.
His son, Rúnar Alex Rúnarsson is a goalkeeper playing for Premier League side Arsenal.

Club career
Rúnar first tried out football at the small club Leiknir, before he started practicing at KR Reykjavík, Iceland's oldest and most successful club, where he spent his youth career. His performances at the country's highest level attracted foreign clubs, and he was eventually transferred to Örgryte IS in Sweden. Halfway in the 1997 season, he moved across the border to Lillestrøm SK of Norway. Rúnar was a success there, thus in 2000, he moved to K.S.C. Lokeren in Belgium where he was very successful.

In May 2007, he returned to his former club KR Reykjavík in Iceland to finish his career. He took over as head coach at KR halfway through the 2010 season and managed the team for four whole seasons after that, resulting in two league titles (2011 and 2013) and three cup titles (2011, 2012 and 2014). Rúnar left KR November 2014, to manage his former club Lillestrøm SK.

International career
Rúnar has been capped 104 times for Iceland, scoring three goals in the process, which was a long-standing record until Birkir Bjarnason broke it in 2021. He was captain of the team in 11 matches, but retired from international duties in 2004.

Honours

Player
KR Reykjavík
Icelandic Cup: 1994

Manager
KR Reykjavík
Úrvalsdeild: 2011, 2013, 2019
Icelandic Cup: 2011, 2012, 2014
League Cup: 2012, 2019
Icelandic Super Cup: 2012, 2014, 2020

See also
List of footballers with 100 or more caps

References

External links
Bio at Lokeren 

1969 births
Living people
Runar Kristinsson
Association football midfielders
Runar Kristinsson
Runar Kristinsson
Runar Kristinsson
Runar Kristinsson
Runar Kristinsson
Örgryte IS players
Lillestrøm SK players
K.S.C. Lokeren Oost-Vlaanderen players
FIFA Century Club
Runar Kristinsson
Expatriate footballers in Sweden
Expatriate footballers in Norway
Expatriate football managers in Norway
Expatriate footballers in Belgium
Expatriate football managers in Belgium
Runar Kristinsson
Eliteserien players
Belgian Pro League players
Allsvenskan players
Runar Kristinsson
Runar Kristinsson
K.S.C. Lokeren Oost-Vlaanderen managers
Runar Kristinsson
Runar Kristinsson
Runar Kristinsson
Úrvalsdeild karla (football) managers